Paul Harrison (26 July 1944 – 17 March 2005) was an Australian rules footballer who played with South Melbourne in the Victorian Football League (VFL).

Notes

External links 		
		

		
		

1944 births		
2005 deaths		
Australian rules footballers from Victoria (Australia)		
Sydney Swans players
Traralgon Football Club players